The Fighting Blade is a 1923 American silent drama film directed by John S. Robertson and released by Associated First National Pictures in 1923.

Cast
 Richard Barthelmess as Karl Van Kerstenbroock 
 Dorothy Mackaill as Thomsine Musgrove
 Lee Baker as Earl of Staversham
 Morgan Wallace as Lord Robert Erisey
 Bradley Barker as Watt Musgrove
 Frederick Burton as Oliver Cromwell 
 Stuart Sage as Viscount Carlsford
 Philip Tead as Lord Trevor
 Walter Horton as Bob Ayskew
 Allyn King as Charlotte Musgrove
 Marcia Harris as Joan Laycock

Preservation
A copy of The Fighting Blade is held by the UCLA Film and Television Archive.

References

External links

Film still at wisconsinhistory.org

1923 films
American silent feature films
First National Pictures films
American black-and-white films
English Civil War films
1920s historical drama films
American historical drama films
Films set in Oxfordshire
Films set in England
Films set in the 1640s
1923 drama films
1920s American films
Silent American drama films